Colin Bain Calder (16 April 1860 – 25 January 1907) was the Scottish founder, and first president, of the Rosario Central football club (Club Atlético Rosario Central) in Argentina.

First years 

Calder was born in Dingwall, Ross and Cromarty, in the Scottish Highlands. His middle name, Bain, was his mother's surname. His family enjoyed prosperity, as his father Alexander Bain was a prestigious cabinetmaker. After his father's death, the family economic situation worsened. His mother worked as a seamstress and the family moved into a poor house.

At the age of ten, Calder was still at school and living with his mother. By the time he was 21, Calder was working as a coach painter at a carriage works and the family was in better circumstances.

Arrival in Rosario 
Calder migrated to Rosario to work for the Central Argentine Railway, a British-owned company, and by 1889, when he was aged 29, he was the manager of the Central Argentine Railway Paint Shop. He was also a local champion of the game of football.

President of Rosario Central 
Before 1889, Calder, together with his secretary Chamberlain, asked the railway company to provide land for teams to play football. This was achieved, and on the historic day of 24 December 1889 he was elected as the first president of the new Rosario Central football club. He made a fiery speech in favor of football, and to the detriment of cricket, the other sport the British had brought to Argentina. He continued to serve as president until 1900. His eleven years in office makes him the club's third longest-serving president, after Víctor Vesco and Federico Flynn.

Private life
In 1890, Calder married Mary Green, who was also from Scotland, born in Addiewell, and a sister of Michael and Daniel Green. They had five children: Lily Jane, Charlotte, Margaret, Elizabeth, and John Colin Alexander.

Calder died in 1907, at the age of 46. His remains are in the Nonconformist Cemetery at Rosario.

Memorials 

On 23 December 2014, by order of the Municipal Council of Rosario, a street was named Calle Colin Calder (Colin Calder Street). This is in the Alem Park and joins Colombres Avenue with Nansen Street.

In 2011, after a contact initiated by one of Calder's descendants, his native city of Dingwall named him an Honorary Citizen.

References 

1860 births
1907 deaths
Rosario Central
People from Dingwall
Founders of association football institutions
Scottish emigrants to Argentina
Scottish founders